Tania Karen de Jong  is an Australian soprano, social entrepreneur, businesswoman, motivational speaker, and event producer. She is the Founder of Creative Innovation Global, Creative Universe, Creativity Australia, Dimension5, Music Theatre Australia, Pot-Pourri, and The Song Room, and co-founder of Mind Medicine Australia. De Jong was named as one of the "100 Most Influential People in Psychedelics" globally by Psychedelic Invest in 2021.

Early life 

 

De Jong was born in Arnhem, the Netherlands, to her Dutch father and Austrian mother, both of whom escaped the Holocaust. Her parents met at the 1961 Maccabiah Games in Israel. De Jong's mother Eva de Jong-Duldig was a Dutch national tennis champion, a Federation Cup player for Australia, and a three-time quarter-finalist at the Wimbledon Championships. 
She also won gold medals at the 1957 Maccabiah Games and the 1961 Maccabiah Games in Israel.

De Jong's maternal grandfather, Karl Duldig, a Polish refugee living in Vienna who escaped the Holocaust with his family, ultimately landing in Australia, was a Vienna-trained sculptor. Her maternal grandmother, Slawa Duldig, also trained as a sculptor in Vienna, and invented the world's first modern folding umbrella.  Her maternal grandparents’ former home in Melbourne's  now operates as a museum named the 'Duldig Studio'.

De Jong and her parents moved from the Netherlands to Melbourne, Australia, when de Jong was one year old.

Academic life 
De Jong graduated from the University of Melbourne with a Bachelor of Law (Honours). She then graduated from the Victorian College of the Arts with a Graduate Diploma in Opera and Music Theatre, and a Postgraduate Diploma in Music (Opera and Voice). She also attended college in the United States for a year, on a tennis scholarship.

Career

Soprano
Aged 14, de Jong was advised by a friend not to undertake singing lessons. She nevertheless auditioned for the chorus of her school's performance of Oklahoma at age 17, and was cast in the lead role.

As a soprano, de Jong has performed as a soloist with a number of orchestras at the Victoria State Opera, and across 40 countries, including at the Sydney Opera House, Seoul Arts Centre, and Opera under the Stars. De Jong has collaborated with soprano Antoinette Halloran, singer Craig Macdonald, composer and pianist Joe Chindamo, and concert pianist Rebecca Chambers.

In May 2022, de Jong produced a musical named Driftwood, based on her mother's memoir of her family. It premiered in Melbourne.

Business career
De Jong is the Founder of Creative Innovation Global, Creative Universe (transformational leadership programs to inspire people to find their voice, and to bring greater wellbeing, engagement, and innovation into organisations), Creativity Australia, Dimension5, Music Theatre Australia, Pot-Pourri, and The Song Room (which has provided access to creative learning for 250,000 disadvantaged Australian children), and co-founder of Mind Medicine Australia. De Jong is known to encourage creative innovation whilst highlighting the interests of marginalised and disadvantaged Australians through her various enterprises.

Event producer

As an event producer, de Jong has hosted nine events focused on "Creative Innovation" in Melbourne, Australia. She is known for advocating for policy change and unity across the business, education, industry, community, and creative sectors during times of anticipated social disruption and change known otherwise as disruptive innovation.

Discography

1995: Rhythm of Life – Pot-Pourri
1997: Something Familiar!, Something Peculiar – Pot-Pourri
1999: This is the Moment – Pot-Pourri
2001: Friends for Life – Pot-Pourri
2003: Chanson d'Amour – Pot-Pourri
2004: Soundsations – Dorje and Diva (Tania de Jong & Chris Walker)
2006: Nella Fantasia – Pot-Pourri
2012: Silver – Pot-Pourri
2015: Heaven on Earth – Tania de Jong
2017: Flying Free – Tania de Jong
2019: The Breezes at Dawn Have Secrets to Tell – Tania de Jong
2020: Solitary Harmony – Tania de Jong and Anthony Barnhill

Achievements and awards 

De Jong was appointed a Member of the Order of Australia in 2008 for service to the arts as a performer and entrepreneur and through the establishment and development of music and arts enrichment programs for schools and communities. She was named in The Australian Financial Review 100 Women of Influence awards in the Arts, Culture and Sport category in 2018. She was also named in Richtopia's list of Top 100 Most Influential Australian Entrepreneurs.

Awards 

 1996: Churchill Fellowship
 1998:  "Outstanding Individual Contribution to Australian Culture" award
 2000: Inducted into the AGSE Entrepreneurs Hall of Fame at Swinburne University
 2001: Telstra Business Women's Awards
 2005: Accessibility Award in The Melbourne Awards
 2006: Ernst and Young Australian Social Entrepreneur of the Year Award
 2007: Member of the Order of Australia
 2009: Brainlink Woman of Achievement 2009.
 2012: Top Social Innovators
 2013: Top Social Innovators Creativity Australia 
 2013–2016: Anthill Top Social Innovations 'Creativity Australia and the With One Voice program
 2016 Melbourne Award for contribution to the community – Creativity Australia
 2016:  Impact 25 Awards for the social sector's most influential people and positive impact 
 2017:  Ethical Enterprise Award 2017
 2018:  Finalist, Third Sector Awards Social Entrepreneur of the Year
 2018: Number 33 of the Top Most Influential Australian Entrepreneurs
 2019: Named in the 100 Most Influential Women in Australia
 2019: Award For Meritorious Service to the Community by The Hon Linda Dessau AC at the Victorian Multicultural Awards For Excellence
2021: "100 Most Influential People in Psychedelics" globally by Psychedelic Invest in 2021.

References

External links

 Tania De Jong – Official home page
 Driftwood Musical home page

Living people
21st-century Australian businesspeople
Australian people of Austrian-Jewish descent
Australian people of Dutch-Jewish descent
Australian people of Polish-Jewish descent
Australian sopranos
Dutch emigrants to Australia
Dutch people of Austrian descent
Dutch people of Polish-Jewish descent
Melbourne Law School alumni
People from Arnhem
Victorian College of the Arts alumni
Year of birth missing (living people)
Singers from Melbourne
Businesspeople from Melbourne